Lion, London Zoological Gardens is a 1896 French short black-and-white silent actuality film, produced by Auguste and Louis Lumière and directed by Alexandre Promio, featuring a male lion reaching through the bars of its enclosure at London Zoological Gardens to get at the meat thrown by its keeper. The film was part of a series, including Tigers and Pelicans, which were one of the earliest examples of animal life on film.

Current status
This short film is available to freely download from the Internet.

References

External links 
 

French silent short films
French black-and-white films
Films set in zoos
Films about lions
1896 short films
1890s French films